Jämtland dialects (jamska) constitute a group of closely related Norrland dialects spoken in the Swedish province of Jämtland, with the exception of Frostviken in the northernmost part of the province, where the traditional dialect is Norwegian. In the eastern part of Jämtland the dialects are transitional to those of Ångermanland. The dialect group is commonly regarded and treated as a single entity. Some people consider it a language separate from Swedish.

The Jämtland dialects share many characteristics with Trøndersk — the dialect spoken to the west in Norwegian Trøndelag, and has historically sometimes been considered to be Norwegian in origin. The current view in Scandinavian dialectology, however, is that the Jämtland dialects belong to the Swedish Norrland dialects.

Name
The local name for the dialects is jamska. There is, however, no common term for the dialects in English, and academic sources call them by various names, such as jamska, jämtska, Jämtish dialect, Jämtlandic dialect, Jämtland dialects or dialects of Jämtland.

The endonym jamska is technically a definite form; the indefinite form jaamsk/jamske is rarely used.

Characteristics

Vowel balance 
Like all other central Scandinavian dialects (Trønder dialects, east Norwegian dialects, Norrland dialects, some Finland Swedish dialects), the most characteristic feature of the Jämtland dialects is vowel balance, an event that caused the vowel endings after heavy syllables to weaken and later even drop entirely in some dialects moving the tone over from ending to the root syllable, example Old Norse kasta  >  (>  "to throw"), while the endings after light syllables instead where reinforced, and even caused a type of umlaut or vowel harmony on the root vowel (example Old Norse lifa  >  >  >  "to live"). According to one theory, this phenomenon has its roots in influence from the neighbouring Saami languages in medieval times.

Prosody 
The Old Norse phonemic contrast of light and heavy syllables is partly preserved in eastern Jämtland dialects, and to some degree in Western Jämtland dialects and in the Oviken parish in southwestern Jämtland.

Primary and secondary diphthongs 

Voiceless L 
The Jämtland dialects, like Icelandic, Faroese, and other northern Scandinavian dialects, have both a voiced  and voiceless  l-sound. This sound comes from a voiced l that has been partly assimilated by either a preceding s or t, or a following t: Old Norse kirtilinn 'gland' has become ,  or similar, Old Norse slíta 'to struggle, to pull' has become ,  or similar, and Old Norse allt 'all' has become  or similar.

Orthography 
There have been attempts to standardize the orthography of the Jämtland dialects. The attempt that has been the most popular is Vägledning för stavning av jamska (1994 and 1995) which is the work of the committee Akademien för jamska consisting of Bodil Bergner, Berta Magnusson and Bo Oscarsson. The most prominent application of this orthography has been to prepare translations of parts of the Bible into the dialect, resulting in the book Nagur Bibelteksta på jamska. An excerpt:

Genesis 1:26–27:
26Å Gud saa: ’Lätt oss gjära når mänish, nager som e lik oss. Å dom ske rå öve fishn derri havan å över foglan pyne himmela, å öve tamdjura öve heile jola, å öve all de djur som kravl å rör se på jorn.´

27Å Gud skapa mänishan å gjool som n avbild ta se själv. Te kær å kviin skapa n dom.The book does not fully follow Vägledning för stavning av jamska. For example, using Vägledning för stavning av jamska one would spell gjæra v. 'do; make', not "gjära". Another spelling convention in Nagur Bibelteksta på jamska is the use of the digraph "sh", in e.g. "mänish" n. 'human being' and "fishn" n. 'the fish', with the same pronunciation as English 'sh' in 'shoe'. Properly using Vägledning för stavning av jamska, this would be spelled sch; see § 26 in the external link below.
People writing Jämtland dialects commonly use the letters of the Swedish alphabet, with the addition of æ and ô. The letters c, q, w, x, and z are usually not used.

 References 

 Notes 

 Bibliography 

 Dä glöm fäll int jamska, published by Margareta Persson (red.),  1986

 External links 
Jemtsk og trøndersk – to nære slektningar by Arnold Dalen
 Vägledning för stavning av jamska by Akademien för jamska''
Publisher's webpage about Nagur Bibelteksta på jamska

Jämtland
Swedish dialects
Languages of Sweden